The first USS Sabalo (SP-225) was a United States Navy patrol vessel in commission from 1917 to 1919. Following World War I, Sabalo was sold to private interests before returning to service as a patrol vessel in World War II, this time with the Royal Canadian Navy, renamed Cougar. Returning to private ownership following the war, the vessel sank in a hurricane in 1950.

Description
Sabalo had a gross register tonnage (GRT) of 204. In U.S. service Sabalo had a complement of 12.

Service history

Construction and US Navy career
Sabalo was built as a civilian motor yacht in 1916 by George Lawley and Sons at Neponset, Massachusetts for W. Earl Dodge of New York City, a local financier. The U.S. Navy acquired her from her owner for $25,230 on 11 May 1917 for World War I service as a patrol vessel. She was commissioned on 20 July 1917 as USS Sabalo (SP-225). Sabalo was decommissioned on 3 March 1919 and returned to Dodge the same day.

Interwar
Dodge kept Sabalo in use as a pleasure yacht until 1921, when he sold her to Van Lear Black of Baltimore, Maryland. Franklin Roosevelt piloted the yacht as a guest of Black. Black fell to his death off the aft deck in 1930. Black's estate in turn sold her in 1931 to the Albert Pack Corporation of Chicago, Illinois, which renamed her Breezin' Thru. In 1937, Leila Y. Post Montgomery of Battle Creek, Michigan, bought Breezin' Thru.

Royal Canadian Navy and postwar service 

After failing to acquire any British vessels at the beginning of World War II for auxiliary purposes, the Royal Canadian Navy discreetly searched the American market for suitable ships. However, American law prevented the sale of ships for possible use in the war to any of the belligerents. The Royal Canadian Navy requisitioned unsuitable Canadian yachts and had their respective owners go the United States and buy those ships the Navy wanted as replacements. Once the ships arrived in Canada, the navy then returned the original yachts and requisitioned the new ones. The Royal Canadian Navy acquired Breezin' Thru in 1940 after she was purchased by Clarence Wallace, the president of Burrard Dry Dock. Breezin Thru had not been Wallace's designated target vessel in the United States, but the shipbroker suggested the yacht after the Royal Canadian Navy's selection was found to be in a poor state.

Once the vessel had arrived on the West Coast of Canada, Wallace used the vessel himself for a couple of weeks to maintain the illusion that Breezin Thru had not been purchased for military purposes. She was rearmed with one 6-pounder gun at the bow. The ship was renamed Cougar and commissioned into the Royal Canadian Navy on 11 September 1940 with the pennant number Z 15. In Canadian service, the vessel had a complement of 5 officers and 35 crew. After commissioning, Cougar had a quiet career on the west coast, initially placed on antisubmarine patrol out of Esquimalt, British Columbia. In May 1942 she was transferred to Prince Rupert Force, based at Prince Rupert, British Columbia. She returned to Esquimalt in June 1944, where she served as an examination vessel. The vessel was paid off on 23 November 1945 and sold to American interests in 1946.

Once again named Breezin' Thru, she operated as a pleasure yacht until sunk during a hurricane at Kingston, Jamaica, in September 1950.

References

Citations

Sources

External links
Department of the Navy: Navy History and Heritage Command: Online Library of Selected Images: Civilian Ships: Sabalo (American Motor Yacht, 1916). Served as USS Sabalo (SP-225) in 1917–1919
NavSource Online: Section Patrol Craft Photo Archive: HMCS Cougar (Z 15) ex-USS Sabalo (SP 225)

Armed yachts of the Royal Canadian Navy
Patrol vessels of the United States Navy
World War I patrol vessels of the United States
Ships built in Boston
1916 ships
Individual yachts
Maritime incidents in 1950
Shipwrecks in the Caribbean Sea